Kolk may refer to:

People
 Douglas Kolk (1963–2014), American artist
 Hanco Kolk (born 1957), Dutch cartoonist
 Lembit Kolk (1907–2003), Estonian politician
 Raimond Kolk (1924–1992), Estonian writer and critic
 Santi Kolk (born 1981), Dutch footballer
 Scott Kolk (1905–1993), American actor 
 Oets Kolk Bouwsma (1898–1978), American philosopher

Other
 KOLK, a radio station licensed to Lakeside, Montana, United States
 Kolk (bog), a waterbody in the middle of a raised or kettle bog
 Kolk (vortex), a powerful underwater vortex
 Kolk, Zagorje ob Savi, a settlement in Upper Carniola, Slovenia
 Kolk (Heidmark), a village destroyed to make the Bergen-Hohne Training Area in Lower Saxony, Germany
 Kolk-Spandau, a subdivision of Spandau in Spandau Borough, Berlin, Germany

See also
 Van der Kolk, a surname (including a list of people with the name)

Dutch-language surnames
Estonian-language surnames
Toponymic surnames